The Fulda–Gersfeld Railway, also called the Rhön Railway, is a railway line in the state of Hesse, Germany. It connects Fulda in the west with Gersfeld, in the Rhön Mountains, in the east.

References

External links
Schedule for the line at the Hessische Landesbahn website 

Railway lines in Hesse
East Hesse